"Miracle" is a single by Dutch artist Ilse DeLange, from her album Incredible. The song was written by DeLange and Sacha Skarbek and was produced by Skarbek and Peter Ibsen. It is the title-song of the movie Bride Flight. The song won the 2009 Rembrandt Award for best film song. "Miracle" reached the peak position in the Dutch Top 40 and stayed there for two weeks.

Charts

Weekly charts

Year-end charts

See also
List of Dutch Top 40 number-one singles of 2009

References

2009 singles
Ilse DeLange songs
Dutch Top 40 number-one singles
2009 songs
Songs written by Sacha Skarbek
Universal Music Group singles